This is a list of Scottish football transfers featuring at least one 2011–12 Scottish Premier League club or one 2011–12 Scottish First Division club which were completed after the end of the summer 2011 transfer window and before the end of the 2011–12 season.

September 2011 – May 2012

See also
 List of Scottish football transfers summer 2011
 List of Scottish football transfers summer 2012

Notes

References

Transfers
Scottish
2011 in Scottish sport
2011 winter